In enzymology, a phthalyl amidase is an enzyme that catalyzes the chemical reaction

a phthalylamide + H2O  phthalic acid + a substituted amine

Thus, the two substrates of this enzyme are phthalylamide and H2O, whereas its two products are phthalic acid and substituted amine.

This enzyme belongs to the family of hydrolases, those acting on carbon-nitrogen bonds other than peptide bonds, specifically in linear amides.  The systematic name of this enzyme class is phthalyl-amide amidohydrolase.

References

 
 
 
 

EC 3.5.1
Enzymes of unknown structure